Barbarea verna is a biennial herb in the family Brassicaceae. Common names include land cress, American cress, bank cress, black wood cress, Belle Isle cress, Bermuda cress, early yellowrocket, early wintercress, scurvy cress, creasy greens, and upland cress. It is native to southern Europe and western Asia, and naturalized elsewhere It has been cultivated as a leaf vegetable in England since the 17th century. As it requires less water than watercress, it is easier to cultivate.

Uses
Land cress is considered a satisfactory substitute for watercress. It can be used in sandwiches, or salads, or cooked like spinach, or used in soup.

Land cress can be grown easily in any garden. Like watercress, it loves water, but does not do well when partially submerged for long periods of time. This perennial needs full sun and frequent watering in any garden, unless near a direct source of water. It is a common green in Appalachian cuisine as one of few plants that can overwinter in the mountains.

Other common names include dryland cress, cassabully, and American watercress. When cooked similarly to Southern collard greens the leaves may be called creasy greens. A variegated form is available.

See also
 Barbarea vulgaris

References

External links
 
 
 

verna
Herbs
Leaf vegetables
Flora of Europe
Taxa named by Philip Miller
Taxa named by Paul Friedrich August Ascherson